An election to the  was held on . The election took place in the aftermath of the February Revolution (with Russia was governed by the Provisional Government), the formation of the Ukrainian Central Rada and the First World War. The election resulted in a victory for the Russian and Jewish socialists.

Candidate lists
Eighteen lists of candidates contested the election. Ahead of the election the Ukrainian socialist parties had decided to launch a list of their own, in protest of what they saw as the 'anti-Ukrainian campaign' in the Russian socialist press. On the other extreme stood the Bloc of Russian Voters, one of the Russian nationalist groups that had emerged in response to the formation of the Central Rada in March 1917. Their main electoral slogan was 'Down with Ukraine and Ukrainization'.

Whilst the General Jewish Labour Bund contested on the same list as the Mensheviks and Socialist-Revolutionaries, the United Jewish Socialist Workers Party (Fareynikte) and the Jewish Social Democratic Labour Party (Poalei Zion) had a joint list. On the non-socialist side of Jewish politics there was the list of the Jewish Democratic Bloc - a coalition of Zionists, the Orthodox Agudath Yisrael and the non-affiliated Council of United Jewish Organizations.

Election result
There were 307,920 eligible voters. Below are two accounts of the election result; an article in the Russian conservative nationalist newspaper Kievlyanin, published , and the work 1917 god na Kiyevshchine: khronika sobytiy ('1917 in the Kiev region: a chronicle of events'), published in 1928 by the Institute of Party History of the Communist Party (Bolsheviks) of Ukraine.

Ukrainian parties won a fifth of the seats in the City Duma. The General Jewish Labour Bund got 7 of the 44 seats won by of the Menshevik-SR-Bund list, Moisei Rafes being one of the Bundist deputies.  was one of the Menshevik deputies. Georgy Pyatakov was one of the Bolshevik deputies. , leader of the Polish section of the Kiev City Bolshevik Committee, was one of the elected deputies.  was the deputy of the Polish Socialist Party in the city duma.

New city government
After the election, B. A. Dreiling (a respected journalist and Menshevik) was elected chairman of the City Duma. A secret ballot was held in the City Duma to elect the new mayor - the Socialist-Revolutionary from Moscow  was an elected with a majority of votes (48 votes) whilst Mykola Porsh of the Ukrainian Bloc obtained 24 votes. The Menshevik Abram Ginzburg ('Naumov') became the deputy mayor. Out of the ten members of the city executive, there were only three Ukrainians. The city government, representing the moderate socialist trend, would face pressure from both Bolshevism and Ukrainian nationalism in the ensuing period.

Gordon M. Hahn (2018) argues that the weak showing of Ukrainian parties in urban elections in the summer of 1917 may have contributed to the Russian Provisional Government's August 1917 decision to reject the draft Ukrainian constitution presented by the Central Rada. By the time of the 1917 Russian Constituent Assembly election, the Ukrainian Bloc vote in Kiev city increased to 26%.

References

Local elections in Russia
Russian Revolution
1910s in Kyiv
Elections in Kyiv